The 1949 Women's Western Open was a golf competition held at the Oklahoma City Golf & Country Club, which was the 20th edition of the event. Louise Suggs won the championship in match play competition by defeating Betty Jameson in the final match, 5 and 4.

Women's Western Open
Golf in Oklahoma
Women's sports in Oklahoma
Women's Western Open
Women's Western Open
Women's Western Open